Malcolm Marmorstein (August 9, 1928 – November 21, 2020) was an American screenwriter and director.

Filmography

Screenwriter
The Doctors (1963 – head writer)
Dark Shadows (1966–67 – 82 episodes)
Peyton Place (1968 – 15 episodes)
Night Gallery (1971 – 1 episode)
S*P*Y*S (1974 – screenplay)
Mary, Mary, Bloody Mary (1975 – screenplay)
Whiffs (1975 – screenplay)
Pete's Dragon (1977 – screenplay)
Return from Witch Mountain (1978 – screenplay)
Poochie (TV film) (1984 – teleplay)
Rose Petal Place (TV special) (1984 – teleplay)
Rose Petal Place: Real Friends (TV film) (1985 – teleplay)
Konrad (TV film) (1985 – teleplay)
CBS Storybreak (1985–87 – 2 episodes)
ABC Weekend Special (1984–88 – 9 episodes)
The Witching of Ben Wagner (TV film) (1990 – teleplay)
Dead Men Don't Die (1991 – screenplay and director)
Love Bites (1993 – screenplay and director)

Death
Marmorstein died on November 21, 2020, at the age of 92 from cancer.

References

External links

British male screenwriters
British television writers
American soap opera writers
1928 births
2020 deaths
American male screenwriters
American male television writers